Hindusthan National Guard was a volunteer social organization launched by Dr. Shyama Prasad Mookerjee, the president of the Akhil Bharatiya Hindu Mahasabha in the aftermath of the Great Calcutta Killings in 1946 to protect the people affected in the riots.

References 

Partition of India
1946 establishments in India
Military units and formations established in 1946
Military wings of nationalist parties